It's in the Bag! is a 1945 comedy film featuring Fred Allen in his only starring film role. The film was released by United Artists at a time when Allen was at the peak of his fame as one of the most popular radio comedians. The film has been preserved by UCLA Film & Television Archive.

Characters and story
A flea circus ringmaster (Allen), Fred Floogle, has strange encounters as he searches for his inheritance, hidden in the seat of one of five chairs.

The film is loosely based on the comic novel The Twelve Chairs (1928) of Ilf and Petrov, later filmed by Mel Brooks as The Twelve Chairs (1970). The team of screenwriters included Jay Dratler, Alma Reville (wife of Alfred Hitchcock) and Morrie Ryskind.

Binnie Barnes plays Mrs. Floogle.

Cameo roles are filled by other radio actors who had already, or were beginning to, become known in movies, including Don Ameche, Rudy Vallee, William Bendix, Jerry Colonna, Robert Benchley, John Carradine, Sidney Toler.

For classic radio fans, the highlight of the film will be Floogle's encounter with Jack Benny, who at the time was involved with Allen in their famous 'feud', which ran for over a decade.

There is an alternative version of the film where Allen's voice periodically breaks in on the action with wisecracks a la the opening credits. This version obscures some of the on-screen dialogue, including the punchline. This version has aired on AMC.

Cast

 Fred Allen - Fred F. Trumble Floogle
 Jack Benny - Jack Benny
 Don Ameche - Don Ameche
 William Bendix - William Bendix
 Victor Moore - Victor Moore
 Rudy Vallee - Rudy Vallee
 Binnie Barnes - Eve Floogle
 Robert Benchley - Parker
 Jerry Colonna - Dr. Greengrass - Psychiatrist
 John Carradine - Jefferson T. Pike
 Gloria Pope - Marion Floogle
 William Terry - Perry Parker
 Minerva Pious - Mrs. Pansy Nussbaum
 Richard Tyler - Homer Floogle (as Dickie Tyler)
 Sidney Toler - Detective Sully
 George Cleveland - Busby - Hotel Manager
 John Miljan - Mr. Arnold
 Ben Welden - Monty - Bookie

Uncredited character actors alphabetically:

 Johnny Arthur - Finley
 Jack Baxley - Minister
 Brooks Benedict - Headwaiter
 Don Brodie - Reporter
 Steve Brodie - Usher
 John Brown - Joe, Nightclub Doorman
 George Chandler - 1st Elevator Operator
 James Conaty - Nightclub Patron
 Don Costello - Mickey
 Kernan Cripps - Police Turnkey
 Mike Donovan - Movie Theatre Patron
 Jay Eaton - Jeweler
 Bess Flowers - Woman in Elevator, and in Floogle's Penthouse
 Byron Foulger - Mr. Teckler
 Edward Gargan - Chair Delivery Man
 Jack Gargan - Movie Usher
 Dick Gordon - Movie Theatre Patron
 Frank Hagney - Nightclub Tough in Fight
 Harry Harvey - Man in Nightclub Kitchen
 Olin Howland - Dr. Greengrass's Doctor
 Lloyd Ingraham - Frederick F. Trumble
 Eddie Kane - Tailor
 Kenner G. Kemp - Movie House Patron in Balcony
 Mike Lally - Movie House Patron, and Cabbie
 Rex Lease - Yacht Salesman
 Mary Livingstone - Mary Livingstone (voice only)
 Wilbur Mack - Nightclub Patron
 Chief Many Treaties - Indian Chief
 Thomas Martin - Penthouse Guest
 Harold Miller - Nightclub Patron, and Wedding Guest
 Bert Moorhouse - Jeweler / Wedding Guest
 Horace Murphy - Officer
 Forbes Murray - Elevator Rider
 Roger Neury - Waiter
 William H. O'Brien - Nightclub Waiter
 Sarah Padden - Woman in Elevator
 Emory Parnell - Mr. Buddoo
 Jack Perrin - Policeman
 Marshall Reed - Hood in Car
 Dewey Robinson - Frogface
 Matty Roubert - Elevator Boy in Theatre
 Harry Semels - Chef
 Dan Seymour - Fatso
 Larry Steers - Nightclub Patron / Wedding Guest
 Harry Strang - Diner
 Charles Sullivan - Nightclub Tough in Fight
 Phil Tead - Ninth National Bank Representative
 Walter Tetley - 2nd Elevator Operator
 Emmett Vogan - Man in Elevator
 Harry von Zell - Phil
 Max Wagner - Nightclub Tough in Fight
 Dave Willock - Stratosphere Balcony Usher
 Marek Windheim - Waiter

Reception
At the time of its release in 1945, Bosley Crowther of The New York Times wrote that, aside from Mr. Allen's comments on the credits at the beginning of the film, which were superlative spoofing and recommended to everyone, it was a "dizzy, bewildering picture...this rat's nest of nonsense defied the sober description of a comparatively rational mind".

A more recent, favorable (3 stars out of 4) review by Leonard Maltin states "Story similar to The Twelve Chairs with flea-circus promoter Allen entitled to inheritance; plot soon goes out the window in favor of unrelated but amusing episodes, including hilarious encounter between Allen and Benny."

References

External links
 
 
 
 

1945 films
1945 comedy films
American comedy films
Films directed by Richard Wallace
Films based on Russian novels
Ilf and Petrov
American black-and-white films
1940s English-language films
1940s American films